KMBY (1240 AM) is a radio station licensed to Monterey, California and serving the Santa Cruz and Monterey areas. The station is owned by Hanford Youth Services and broadcasts an oldies format.

History
The station went on the air in 1935 as KDON. It moved from 1210 to 1240 kHz in 1941 when NARBA took effect.

Saul Levine's Mount Wilson FM Broadcasters, Inc., bought KNRY from IHR Educational Broadcasting in December 2013. The format was changed to jazz in early January 2014. In May 2014, KNRY dropped the jazz format and began stunting, first with a simulcast of Los Angeles classical station KMZT-FM ("K-Mozart") and then with a loop of 25 alternative rock songs. On June 9, KNRY-FM (K294CA) became alternative rock "Alt 106.7." KNRY simulcast KMZT-FM.

On March 30, 2015, KNRY changed their format from a simulcast of classical-formatted KMZT-FM to adult standards, branded as "K-SURF 1240". The syndication was also heard on KKGO's HD2 subchannel in Los Angeles.

In April 2020, KNRY went silent. In October 2020, Mount Wilson FM Broadcasters donated the station to Hanford Youth Services Inc but retained the call letters and studio equipment. The donation was consummated on December 7, 2020.

Hanford Youth Services relaunched the station as oldies-formatted KNBI—branded KMBY, using the call sign associated with this station between 1949 and 1978—in December 2020. The donation required Hanford Youth Services to close its low-power FM station in Hanford, KOAD-LP, as a group cannot own a full-service and a low-power FM radio station at the same time. The KMBY call sign formally returned on April 20, 2022.

References

External links

MBY
Oldies radio stations in the United States
Radio stations established in 1935
1935 establishments in California